Malik Sawadogo (born 12 July 2003) is a Swiss professional footballer who plays as a left-back for Servette.

Career
A youth product of CS Interstar and Servette, Sawadogo signed his first professional contract with Servette on 24 February 2021. He made his professional debut with Servette in a 2–1 Swiss Super League win over Young Boys on 4 December 2021.

International career
Born in Switzerland, Sawadogo is of Burkinabé descent. He is a youth international for Switzerland, having represented the Switzerland U19s.

References

External links
 
 Football.ch Profile
 SFL Profile

2003 births
Living people
Footballers from Geneva
Swiss men's footballers
Swiss people of Burkinabé descent
Servette FC players
Swiss Super League players
Association football fullbacks